Ebrahim Mirza or Ebrahim Shah Afshar (died 1749) was the Shah of Persia during the Afsharid Empire from July to September 1748. Born with the name Mohammad-Ali, he was the son of Ebrahim Khan Afshar (Mohammad-Ebrahim Beg), and thus Adel Shah's brother and Nader Shah's nephew. After his father's death in 1739, he took the name Ebrahim Beg. He toppled his brother in order to seize the power, and he blinded him on July 6, 1748. However, two months later his own troops rebelled against him. He was slain on 24 September, ending his short reign. Ebrahim was succeeded by Nader's grandson, Shahrokh Mirza, who was elected by the nobles to ascend to the throne.

References

Sources
 

Afsharid monarchs
Murdered Persian monarchs
1749 deaths
Year of birth unknown
18th-century murdered monarchs
Ethnic Afshar people
1749 murders in Asia